Precious Simelane (10 October 1977 – 21 April 2005) was a South African actress. She was best known for her roles in the popular serials Backstage and Generations.

Personal life
She was born on 10 October 1977 in Pretoria, South Africa. She first attended to St Anne's Primary School for primary education and later moved to Loreto Convent. She completed secondary education at Pro Arte. She later studied drama at the Tshwane University of Technology and at University of South Africa (Unisa).

Death
She died on 21 April 2005 after a temporary illness at George Mukhari Hospital at the age of 27. Funeral took place in Pretoria where final rites service was held at the Apostolic Mission Faith Church in Atteridgeville. She was cremated in Zandfontein Cemetery.

Career
She became highly popular with the role 'Zanele Bhengu' in the television soapie Generations.

Filmography

References

External links
 
 Gone but not forgotten celebrities

1977 births
South African television actresses
21st-century South African actresses
South African film actresses
South African stage actresses
2005 deaths
Tshwane University of Technology alumni
University of South Africa alumni
Burials in South Africa